Meridianville is an unincorporated community and census-designated place (CDP) in Madison County, Alabama, United States, and is included in the Huntsville-Decatur Combined Statistical Area.  As of the 2020 census, the population of the CDP was 8,209.

Geography
Meridianville is located in northern Madison County at  (34.869312, -86.578373). It is north of Huntsville and east of Harvest and is bordered by Hazel Green to the north and Moores Mill to the east. It is the third largest community in Madison County by population after Huntsville and Madison. 

Education 
Meridianville is served by the following public schools:
Lynn Fanning Elementary (grades K-3)
Moores Mill Intermediate School (4-6)
Meridianville Middle School (7-8)
Hazel Green High School (9-12)

Demographics

Meridianville first appeared on the 1880 U.S. Census as an unincorporated community of 105 residents. It did not appear again on the census for a century (1980), when it was designated a census designated place (CDP).

2000 census
As of the census of 2000, there were 4,117 people, 1,492 households, and 1,250 families living in the community. The racial makeup of the community was 86.62% White, 9.40% Black or African American, 1.07% Native American, 0.73% Asian, 0.05% Pacific Islander, 0.19% from other races, and 1.94% from two or more races. 0.70% of the population were Hispanic or Latino of any race.

There were 1,492 households, out of which 40.5% had children under the age of 18 living with them, 72.8% were married couples living together, 8.8% had a female householder with no husband present, and 16.2% were non-families. 14.7% of all households were made up of individuals, and 4.6% had someone living alone who was 65 years of age or older. The average household size was 2.76 and the average family size was 3.05.

In the community, the population was spread out, with 27.5% under the age of 18, 6.3% from 18 to 24, 31.4% from 25 to 44, 25.1% from 45 to 64, and 9.6% who were 65 years of age or older. The median age was 38 years. For every 100 females, there were 97.7 males. For every 100 females age 18 and over, there were 96.1 males.

The median income for a household in the community was $54,766, and the median income for a family was $61,367. Males had a median income of $42,274 versus $29,241 for females. The per capita income for the community was $23,626. About 2.9% of families and 4.2% of the population were below the poverty line, including 3.9% of those under age 18 and none of those age 65 or over.

2010 census
As of the census of 2010, there were 6,021 people, 2,248 households, and 1,743 families living in the community. The racial makeup of the community was 76.3% White, 18.5% Black or African American, .7% Native American, 1.7% Asian, 0.2% Pacific Islander, 0.7% from other races, and 2.0% from two or more races. 2.7% of the population were Hispanic or Latino of any race.

There were 2,248 households, out of which 33.8% had children under the age of 18 living with them, 63.7% were married couples living together, 10.1% had a female householder with no husband present, and 22.5% were non-families. 19.3% of all households were made up of individuals, and 6.3% had someone living alone who was 65 years of age or older. The average household size was 2.68 and the average family size was 3.08.

In the community, the population was spread out, with 25.6% under the age of 18, 6.9% from 18 to 24, 26.5% from 25 to 44, 28.9% from 45 to 64, and 12.0% who were 65 years of age or older. The median age was 38.9 years. For every 100 females, there were 93.4 males. For every 100 females age 18 and over, there were 91.4 males.

The median income for a household in the community was $68,864, and the median income for a family was $76,449. Males had a median income of $55,956 versus $36,100 for females. The per capita income for the community was $26,834. About 2.4% of families and 5.8% of the population were below the poverty line, including 5.8% of those under age 18 and 6.4% of those age 65 or over.

2020 census

As of the 2020 United States census, there were 8,209 people, 2,759 households, and 2,020 families residing in the CDP.

Education
The local school district is Madison County Schools.

References

Unincorporated communities in Alabama
Census-designated places in Madison County, Alabama
Census-designated places in Alabama
Huntsville-Decatur, AL Combined Statistical Area
Unincorporated communities in Madison County, Alabama